Martti Ilmari Lintulahti (1917–1982) was a Finnish diplomat and  Master of Political Science as education. He was a Chargé d'Affaires to Iraq from 1969 to 1973 and  Ambassador from 1973 to 1975, as well as an Ambassador to Brazil from 1975 to 1982 and a negotiating officer in the Ministry for Foreign Affairs in 1982.

References 

Ambassadors of Finland to Iraq
Ambassadors of Finland to Brazil
1917 births
1982 deaths